The Streamlining Energy Efficiency for Schools Act of 2014 is a bill that would require the United States Department of Energy to establish a centralized clearinghouse to disseminate information on federal programs, incentives, and mechanisms for financing energy-efficient retrofits and upgrades at schools. The bill would require the DOE to collect the data from all federal agencies and store it in one place online.

The bill was introduced into the United States House of Representatives during the 113th United States Congress.

Provisions of the bill
This summary is based largely on the summary provided by the Congressional Research Service, a public domain source.

The Streamlining Energy Efficiency for Schools Act of 2014 would amend the Energy Policy and Conservation Act to direct the United States Secretary of Energy (DOE), acting through the Office of Energy Efficiency and Renewable Energy, to act as the lead federal agency for coordinating and disseminating information on existing federal programs and assistance that may be used to help initiate, develop, and finance energy efficiency, renewable energy, and energy retrofitting projects for schools.

The bill would require the Secretary to: (1) carry out a review of existing programs and financing mechanisms available in or from appropriate federal agencies with jurisdiction over energy financing and facilitation that are currently used or may be used for such purposes; (2) establish a federal cross-departmental collaborative coordination, education, and outreach effort to streamline communication and promote available federal opportunities and assistance for such projects that enables states, local educational agencies, and schools to use existing federal opportunities more effectively and to form partnerships with governors, state energy programs, local educational, financial, and energy officials, state and local officials, nonprofit organizations, and other appropriate entities to support project initiation; (3) provide technical assistance for states, local educational agencies, and schools to help develop and finance projects that meet specified requirements; (4) develop and maintain a single online resource website with contact information for relevant technical assistance and support staff in the Office for states, local educational agencies, and schools to effectively access and use federal opportunities and assistance to develop such projects; and (5) establish a process for recognition of schools that have successfully implemented such projects and are willing to serve as resources for other local educational agencies and schools to assist initiation of similar efforts.

Congressional Budget Office report
This summary is based largely on the summary provided by the Congressional Budget Office, as ordered reported by the House Committee on Energy and Commerce on April 30, 2014. This is a public domain source.

H.R. 4092 would require the Secretary of Energy to establish a centralized clearinghouse to disseminate information on federal programs, incentives, and mechanisms for financing energy-efficient retrofits and upgrades at schools. The bill would direct the Secretary to work with other federal agencies to develop a comprehensive list of such federal programs and to streamline efforts to publicize them through education and outreach.

Based on information from the Department of Energy (DOE) about current levels of spending for similar efforts, the Congressional Budget Office (CBO) estimates that enacting H.R. 4092 would not significantly affect the federal budget. We estimate that any additional costs incurred by DOE to expand existing efforts to promote opportunities to boost energy efficiency of schools under H.R. 4092 would total less than $500,000 annually, assuming the availability of appropriated funds. H.R. 4092 would not affect direct spending or revenues; therefore, pay-as-you-go procedures do not apply.

H.R. 4092 contains no intergovernmental or private-sector mandates as defined in the Unfunded Mandates Reform Act and would impose no costs on state, local, or tribal governments.

Procedural history

The Streamlining Energy Efficiency for Schools Act of 2014 was introduced into the United States House of Representatives on February 26, 2014, by Rep. Matthew A. Cartwright (D, PA-17). The bill was referred to the United States House Committee on Energy and Commerce and the United States House Energy Subcommittee on Energy and Power. The bill was scheduled to be voted on under a suspension of the rules on June 23, 2014.

Debate and discussion
Rep. Cartwright, who introduced the bill, argued that "the bill is a strategic and cost-saving investment to relieve the fiscal pressure felt by schools across the country while bringing us closer to energy security." Cartwright cited statistics from Energy Star indicating that schools in the United States spend $6 billion a year on energy bills, the second largest category of spending after personnel.

ASHRAE, formerly the "American Society of Heating, Refrigerating and Air Conditioning Engineers", supported the bill. The U.S. Green Building Council also supported the bill, saying that it "aims to make important improvements to existing federal policies."

See also
List of bills in the 113th United States Congress

References

External links

Library of Congress - Thomas H.R. 4092
beta.congress.gov H.R. 4092
GovTrack.us H.R. 4092
OpenCongress.org H.R. 4092
WashingtonWatch.com H.R. 4092
Congressional Budget Office's report on H.R. 4092
House Energy Committee markup of H.R. 4092

United States proposed federal environmental legislation
Energy in the United States
Proposed legislation of the 111th United States Congress
Proposed legislation of the 112th United States Congress
Proposed legislation of the 113th United States Congress
Proposed legislation of the 114th United States Congress
Proposed legislation of the 115th United States Congress
Proposed legislation of the 116th United States Congress
2014 in the environment